Pine Lake may refer to:

Inhabited places

Canada
 Pine Lake, Alberta

United States
 Pine Lake, Arizona
 Pine Lake, Georgia
 Pine Lake, Wisconsin, a town
 Pine Lake, Iron County, Wisconsin, an unincorporated community
 Pine Lake Township, Cass County, Minnesota
 Pine Lake Township, Clearwater County, Minnesota
 Pine Lake Township, Otter Tail County, Minnesota
 Pine Lake Township, Pine County, Minnesota

Lakes

Canada
 Pine Lake (Alberta)

United States
 Pine Lake (San Francisco), California
 Pine Lake (Duxbury, Massachusetts)
 Pine Lake (West Bloomfield Township, Michigan)
 Pine Lake (Cass County, Minnesota)
 Pine Lake (Chisago County, Minnesota)
 Pine Lake (Clearwater County, Minnesota)
 Pine Lake (Otter Tail County, Minnesota)
 Pine Lake (Delaware County, New York)
 Pine Lake (Fulton County, New York)
 Pine Lake (Hamilton County, New York)
 Pine Lake (Lewis County, New York)
 Pine Lake (Washington), popular recreation and fishing spot
 Pine Lake (Rusk County, Wisconsin)
 Pine Lake (Wisconsin), source of the Montreal River, Wisconsin
 Pine Lake Environmental Campus, property of Hartwick College
 Upper Pine Lake and Lower Pine Lake, in Pine Lake State Park, Iowa
 Lake Charlevoix in Charlevoix County, Michigan, known as Pine Lake until 1926

See also
 Big Pine Lake (Isanti County, Minnesota), United States
 Little Pine Lake, Brantingham, New York, United States
 Nya Upsala, Pine Lake Swedish Settlement in Pine Lake, Wisconsin, United States
 Pine Lake Aerodrome, in Canada
 Pine Lake Camp, Salvation Army camp located in Pine Lake, Alberta, Canada
 Pine Lake Park (disambiguation)
 Pine Lake tornado (2000), central Alberta, Canada
 Pine Lake Township (disambiguation)